21 Days (also known as 21 Days Together, The First and the Last and Three Weeks Together) is a 1940 British drama film based on the short 1919 play The First and the Last by John Galsworthy. It was directed by Basil Dean and stars Vivien Leigh, Laurence Olivier and Leslie Banks. The film was renamed 21 Days Together for the American market.

Plot
Larry Darrant, the black sheep of his family, returns home to London from an unsuccessful business venture in Kenya and embarks on an affair with a married woman, Wanda. When Wanda's long-absent husband, Henry, who is Russian, shows up, he tries to extort money from the lovers, and pulls a knife on Larry when he refuses to pay. In the ensuing fight Henry is accidentally killed when he strikes his head on the fire fender.

Larry places Henry's body in a quiet brick archway at Glove Lane. He then visits his brother Keith, a successful barrister hoping to soon become a judge, for advice. Keith tells Larry to leave the country for a while to avoid capture. In part Keith's motivation is to avoid the damage Larry's arrest would do to his own career.

However, Larry refuses to leave, and returns to the alley where he had left the body. There he encounters John Evan, a former minister turned tramp, who picks up bloody gloves that Larry has dropped in the street. When Evan is found with the gloves, he is arrested for Wallen's murder, and the police believe they have sufficient evidence for a conviction. Evan's sense of disgrace for robbing the dead body of a ring is such that he insists on his guilt.

When Larry learns of Evan's arrest, he considers himself a temporarily free man and decides to marry Wanda. Larry and Wanda try to compress 30 years of idyllic life into the course of just 21 days, as Larry plans to turn himself in to the police before Evan's trial begins. On the day when Evan is sentenced to hang, Keith begs his brother to remain silent and let the condemned man die. Larry, set on doing the right thing, refuses and leaves for the police station. He is stopped on the steps of the station by Wanda, chasing after him, who has learned that Evan died from a heart attack on his way to jail.

Cast

 Vivien Leigh as Wanda Wallen
 Laurence Olivier as Larry Darrant
 Leslie Banks as Keith Darrant
 Francis L. Sullivan as Mander
 David Horne as Beavis
 Hay Petrie as John Aloysius Evan
 William Dewhurst as the Lord Chief Justice
 Esme Percy as Henry Wallen
 Frederick Lloyd as Swinton
 Robert Newton as Tolly
 Victor Rietti as Antonio
 Morris Harvey as Pawnbroker Alexander MacPherson 
 Elliott Mason as Frau Grunlich
 Arthur Young as Ascher
 Meinhart Maur as Carl Grunlich
 Andreas Malandrinos as Cafe Tyrol Waiter (uncredited)

Production
Producer Alexander Korda intended 21 Days to be a star vehicle for Vivien Leigh, but his constant interference caused great problems on the set. He rearranged shooting schedules and even added a sequence, and director Basil Dean reputedly never saw a rough cut or the finished product. The title change to 21 Days was attributed to Korda. Principal photography took place in 1937 at Denham Film Studios. Korda's younger brother Vincent Korda was the film's art director on and was responsible for the set design.

Following Vivien Leigh's star turn with her performance as Scarlett O'Hara in Gone with the Wind (1939), Korda shelved 21 Days for two years before releasing it to Columbia Pictures.

Reception
In a review for The New York Times, critic Bosley Crowther wrote: "True, it is no deathless drama—is little more than a cultivated penny-thriller, in fact—and Miss Leigh, as the party of the second part, is required to devote her charm and talents to nothing more constructive than making the apparently inevitable parting from poor Mr. Olivier seem exceedingly painful, indeed. But it is a highly charged 'meller,' rigid throughout with suspense and nicely laced with much tender emotion."

References
Notes

Bibliography

 Walker, Alexander. Vivien: The Life of Vivien Leigh. New York: Grove Press, 1987. .

External links
 
 

Films based on works by John Galsworthy
1940 films
1940 drama films
British drama films
British black-and-white films
1940s English-language films
British films based on plays
Films directed by Basil Dean
London Films films
Films with screenplays by Graham Greene
Films produced by Alexander Korda
Columbia Pictures films
Films set in 1938
1940s British films